The Friendship Port (Port de l'Amité) is an artificial deepwater port located in Nouakchott, Mauritania. It was built during the 1980s by a Chinese company to allow the city, capital of Mauritania, to be supplied more cheaply than by overland from Dakar, Senegal. As the location is not a natural harbor, concrete block breakwaters had to be used to create a safe location for the ships. Plans are being made to increase its capacity.

History
There are no natural deepwater ports along the Atlantic coast of Africa between Nouadhibou, Mauritania and Dakar, Senegal and the explosive growth of Nouakchott during the 1970s and 1980s threatened to overwhelm the modest road network connecting Nouakchott and Senegal. The People's Republic of China offered an interest-free, 50-year loan of $150 million in the early 1980s to finance construction of a port by the China Road & Bridge Corporation. Despite these difficulties, the facilities were completed several months ahead of schedule and the port opened on 17 September 1986.

In 2001, Spain announced that it would build an oil terminal near the port to handle the country's increasing demands. Two years later Mali said that it would construct  of warehouse space to handle its own imports and exports through the port.

Capacity and facilities
The port was designed for a capacity of 500,000 deadweight tons (DWT) of cargo a year, but was handling 1,500,000 tons (DWT) by 2009. The main quay is long enough to accommodate three ships at once, each of 10,000 DWT. As of 2011, the World Bank was investigating funding a new shipping container facility at the port.

Citations

References

Buildings and structures completed in 1986
Ports and harbours in Africa
Nouakchott